Libertinaje is the fourth studio album by the rock band Bersuit Vergarabat. It was released in 1998 on Universal Music. The album was recorded in the Estudios Panda (Buenos Aires) between April 20, 1998 and May 23, 1998, and in La Casa (Los Angeles) between June 3, 1998 and July 14, 1998.

Track listing
"Yo Tomo" [I Drink] (Righi, Verenzuela, Cordera, Cépedes, Subirá, Martín) – 3:32
"A Los Tambores" [To The Drums] (Subirá, Céspedes, Martín, Cordera, Righi) – 3:22
"De Onda" (Verenzuela) – 3:01
"Se Viene" [It Comes] (Cordera, Verenzuela) – 3:25
"Murguita Del Sur" [South Murguita] (Cordera) – 4:16
"Sr. Cobranza" (De la Vega) – 4:19
"Vuelos" (Céspedes) [Flights] – 4:24
"Gente De Mierdas" [Shit People] (Cordera, Céspedes, Righi, Verenzuela, Martín, Subirá, García) – 2:46
"Sincerebro" (Cordera, Céspedes) – 3:27
"A Marça De Deux" (Cordera, Barcigaluppi) – 5:17
"C.S.M." (Subirá, Céspedes) – 2:40
"¿Qué Pasó?" [What Happened?] (Cordera, Martín) – 6:03

Charts and sales

References

1998 albums
Bersuit Vergarabat albums
Albums produced by Gustavo Santaolalla